Cyanin may refer to:

 Cyanine, a non-systematic name of a synthetic dye family belonging to polymethine group
 Cyanin (anthocyanin) (Cyanidin-3,5-O-diglucoside), a diglucoside of the anthocyanidin cyanidin